Judith Elizabeth Mank is an American-British zoologist who is a Canada 150 Chair at the University of British Columbia. Her research considers how selection produces variations in form. She is interested in sexual dimorphism and the formation of sex chromosomes.

Early life and education 
Mank studied anthropology at the University of Florida. She moved to Pennsylvania State University for graduate studies, joining the School of Forest Resources. After completing her master's degree she moved to the University of Georgia for doctoral research. Her research considered reproductive diversity in fish.

Research and career 
Mank was a lecturer at the University of Oxford and then professor at University College London. She joined the faculty at the University of British Columbia in 2018, where she was made a professor and Canada 150 Chair. Her research considers meiosis and the evolution of biological inheritance. Meiosis, the process of cell division which results in recombination and the production of new alleles, is a critical process in evolution. Mank makes use of genomic data to understand how ecological factors impact this recombination, and why unusual segregation patterns evolve. She has studied the pigmentation of guppies in an effort to understand how color influences predation and mate choice.

Awards and honors 
 2008 American Society of Naturalists Young Investigator Award
 2009 Society for the Study of Evolution Dobzhansky Prize
 2013 Berlin Institute for Advanced Study Fellow
 2013 Zoological Society of London Scientific Medal
 2016 Royal Society Wolfson Fellowship
 2020 Uppsala University Honorary Doctorate

Selected publications

References

Living people
University of Georgia alumni
University of Florida alumni
Pennsylvania State University alumni
Academic staff of the University of British Columbia
American zoologists
American women scientists
1976 births